= La U =

La U may refer to:

- Club Universitario de Deportes - A traditional Peruvian football club.
- Club Universidad de Chile - A Chilean football club.
- Club Universitario - A Bolivian football club.
